8-Oxogeranial is a chemical substance (also incorrectly called 10-oxogeranial), that is a monoterpene.  The terpenoid is produced by 8-hydroxygeraniol dehydrogenase which uses  8-hydroxygeraniol as its substrate.  8-Oxogeranial is itself a substrate for iridoid synthase which synthesizes cis–trans-iridodial and cis–trans-nepetalactol.

References

Monoterpenes
Aldehydes